Inanda 88.4 is a South African Community radio station situated in Inanda, KwaZulu-Natal, which broadcasts in English and Zulu to most of the KwaZulu Natal, province (South Africa). As of November 2010, The station boasts an audience of more than 102,000

Inanda Community Radio is a 24 hour; eThekwini Municipality based community radio which is an integral part of the INK (Inanda, Ntuzuma, Kwa-Mashu) urban renewal program by providing link to the grass roots level of the community. Inanda Community Radio is not only a tool for providing for information dissemination but catalyst for change. The footprint covers the greater eThekwini Municipality and the outskirts of Pietermaritzburg, Inchanga in the west, Tongaat North, Stanger, Ugu District south coast up to  Port Shepstone, In Northern KZN Mtubatuba, Hluhluwe, Mpangeni, Richards Bay, Nkandla are covered.

The station is an aspirational best community radio in the greater eThekwini region and offers through our various programmes, a link in the emerging black politically and socially aware middle class. (“The black middle class, “defined in South Africa as people who earn at least R154 000 per annum, is said to have grown by 368 percent between 1998 and 2004 largely due to the government’s black empowerment policies intended to increase black participation in the mainstream economy.

The programming constructed around a playlist of the best music today, including that which is from prior years as well as development, interactive and emotive features woven into daily programming.

According to official numbers from the South African Advertising Research Foundation released in 2010, Inanda 88.4 is one of the significant community radio stations in KZN province.

History
Inanda 88.4 FM has been broadcasting since 2003 under special events licenses. In 2006 the station obtained a four year Sound Broadcasting license and went on air on March 27, 2009. The station is community development based and it has a specific focus on education and raising community awareness on various developmental initiatives and socioeconomic matters. The programming format is 60% content and 40% music, with South African music represented across genres of music making up 60% of the tracks played.

Playout and transmission
It is possible to listen to the station online. The analogue terrestrial (FM) transmitter is found on 88.4 MHz in and around Durban.

References

External links

SA radio listenership
MDDA Congratulates Inanda FM
targetmedia.co.za
themediaconnection.co.za

Community radio stations in South Africa
Radio stations in Durban
Radio stations established in 2003